Leo is an unincorporated community in Roseau County, in the U.S. state of Minnesota.

History
A post office called Leo was established in 1897, and remained in operation until 1915. The community was named after Pope Leo VIII.

References

Unincorporated communities in Roseau County, Minnesota
Unincorporated communities in Minnesota